"An Occurrence at Owl Creek Bridge" (1890) is a short story by the American writer and Civil War veteran Ambrose Bierce. Described as "one of the most famous and frequently anthologized stories in American literature", it was originally published by The San Francisco Examiner on July 13, 1890, and was first collected in Bierce's book Tales of Soldiers and Civilians (1891). The story, which is set during the American Civil War, is known for its irregular time sequence and twist ending. Bierce's abandonment of strict linear narration in favor of the internal mind of the protagonist is an early example of the stream of consciousness narrative mode.

Plot
Peyton Farquhar, a civilian who is also a wealthy planter and slave owner, is being prepared for execution by hanging from an Alabama railroad bridge during the American Civil War. Six military men and a company of infantrymen are present, guarding the bridge and carrying out the sentence. Farquhar thinks of his wife and children and is then distracted by a noise that, to him, sounds like an unbearably loud clanging; it is actually the ticking of his watch. He considers the possibility of jumping off the bridge and swimming to safety if he can free his tied hands, but the soldiers drop him from the bridge before he can act on the idea.

In a flashback, Farquhar and his wife are relaxing at home one evening when a soldier dressed in Confederate gray rides up to the gate. Farquhar, a supporter of the Confederacy, learns from him that Union troops have seized the Owl Creek railroad bridge and repaired it. The soldier suggests that Farquhar might be able to burn the bridge down if he can slip past its guards. He then leaves, but doubles back after nightfall to return north the way he came. The soldier is actually a disguised Union scout who has lured Farquhar into a trap, as any civilian caught interfering with the railroads will be hanged.

The story returns to the present, and Farquhar falls into the creek when the rope around his neck breaks. He frees his hands, pulls the noose away, and rises to the surface to begin his escape. His senses now greatly sharpened, he dives and swims downstream to avoid rifle and cannon fire. Farquhar walks all day long through a seemingly endless forest, and that night he begins to hallucinate, seeing strange constellations and hearing whispered voices in an unknown language. He travels on, urged by the thought of his wife and children despite the pains caused by his ordeal. The next morning, after having apparently fallen asleep while walking, he finds himself at the gate to his plantation. He rushes to embrace his wife, but before he can do so, he feels a heavy blow upon the back of his neck; there is a loud noise and a flash of white, and "then all is darkness and silence". It is revealed that Farquhar never escaped at all; he imagined the entire third part of the story during the time between falling through the bridge and the noose breaking his neck.

Publication and reception 
"An Occurrence at Owl Creek Bridge" was first published in the July 13, 1890, issue of The San Francisco Examiner and collected in the compilation Tales of Soldiers and Civilians (1891).

Editors of a modern compilation described the story as "one of the most famous and frequently anthologized stories in American literature", Author Kurt Vonnegut wrote in 2005: "I consider anybody a twerp who hasn't read the greatest American short story, which is '[An] Occurrence at Owl Creek Bridge,' by Ambrose Bierce. It isn't remotely political. It is a flawless example of American genius, like 'Sophisticated Lady' by Duke Ellington or the Franklin stove."

Analysis 

The real Owl Creek Bridge is in Tennessee; Bierce, who personally assisted in three military executions during his time as a soldier, likely changed the setting to northern Alabama because the actual bridge did not have a railroad near it at the time the story is set.

The story explores the concept of "dying with dignity". The story shows the reader that the perception of "dignity" provides no mitigation for the deaths that occur in warfare. It further demonstrates psychological escape right before death. Farquhar experiences an intense delusion to distract him from his inevitable death. The moment of horror that the readers experience at the end of the piece, when they realize that he dies, reflects the distortion of reality that Farquhar encounters.

It is not only the narrator who experiences the story but also the readers themselves. As he himself once put it, Bierce detested "bad readers—readers who, lacking the habit of analysis, lack also the faculty of discrimination, and take whatever is put before them, with the broad, blind catholicity of a slop-fed conscience of a parlor pig".
Farquhar was duped by a Federal scout—and cursory readers on their part are successfully duped by the author who makes them think they are witnessing Farquhar's lucky escape from the gallows. Instead, they only witness the hallucination of such an escape taking place in the character's unconscious mind which is governed by the instinct of self-preservation.

Influence 
The plot device of a long period of subjective time passing in an instant, such as the imagined experiences of Farquhar while falling, has been explored by several authors. An early literary antecedent appears in the
Tang dynasty tale, The Governor of Nanke, by Li Gongzuo. Another medieval antecedent is Don Juan Manuel's Tales of Count Lucanor, Chapter XII ( 1335), "Of that which happened to a Dean of Santiago, with Don Illan, the Magician, who lived at Toledo", in which a life happens in an instant. Charles Dickens's essay "A Visit to Newgate" wherein a man dreams he has escaped his death sentence has been speculated as a possible source for the story. Bierce's story, in turn, may have influenced "The Snows of Kilimanjaro" by Ernest Hemingway and Pincher Martin by William Golding.

Bierce's story highlighted the idea of subjective time passing at the moment of death and popularized the fictional device of false narrative continuation, which has been in wide circulation ever since then. Notable examples of this technique from the early-to-mid 20th century include H. G. Wells's "The Door in the Wall" (1906) and "The Beautiful Suit" (1909), Vladimir Nabokov's "Details of a Sunset" (1924) and "The Aurelian" (1930), Jorge Luis Borges's "The Secret Miracle" (1944) and "The South" (1949), William Golding's Pincher Martin (1956), Terry Gilliam's Brazil (1985) as well as Julio Cortázar's "The Island at Midday", and Leo Perutz's "From Nine to Nine". Alexander Lernet-Holenia's novella Der Baron Bagge (1936) shares many similarities with Bierce's story, including the setting in the midst of a war and the bridge as a symbol for the moment of passage from life to death.

Among more recent works, David Lynch's later films have been compared to "An Occurrence at Owl Creek Bridge", although they also have been interpreted as Möbius strip storylines. A particularly strong inspiration for the 1990 film Jacob's Ladder, for both Bruce Joel Rubin and Adrian Lyne, was Robert Enrico's 1962 short film An Occurrence at Owl Creek Bridge, one of Lyne's favourite movies. Tobias Wolff's short story "Bullet in the Brain" (1995) reveals the protagonist's past through relating what he remembers—and does not—in the millisecond after he is fatally shot. John Shirley's 1999 short story "Occurrence at Owl Street Ridge" about a depressed housewife is modeled after Bierce's story and Bierce plays a minor role in it.

Critics have noted a similar final act in the 1985 film Brazil. In the 2005 film Stay (with Ewan McGregor, Naomi Watts and Ryan Gosling; directed by Marc Forster; written by David Benioff) the entire story takes place in a character's mind after a tragic accident. Similar to Bierce's story, in the Boardwalk Empire episode "Farewell Daddy Blues" (2013), Richard Harrow hallucinates a long journey home to his family before his death is revealed. In an interview with Afterbuzz, Teen Wolf writer and creator Jeff Davis said that the final sequence of the Season 3 finale (2014) was inspired by "An Occurrence at Owl Creek Bridge".

An episode of the British TV series Black Mirror followed a similar plot. In the episode "Playtest", Cooper tests a revolutionary video game that causes him to confuse the game with reality. Similar to Bierce's protagonist, it is revealed at the end that the entire sequence of events has taken place in the short span of his death. In Scrubs, the episode "My Occurrence" has a similar plot structure, where the main character J.D. believes that a clerical mistake was made with his patient Ben. J.D. spends the entire episode trying to get it rectified, only to realize at the end that this was all a fantasy to avoid the reality that Ben had been diagnosed with leukemia. The episode's title is also a reference to the story.

The film Ghosts of War (2020 film) is about a group of soldiers who find themselves in a time loop. In one scene, one of the main characters briefly tells his fellow soldiers about "An Occurrence at Owl Creek Bridge", implying that they may be going through a similar situation. It is later revealed that they are in fact part of an experiment and the entire situation is taking place in their minds. The broken hangman's knot and lost traveler trope figure into the plot for the movie From Dusk Till Dawn 3: The Hangman's Daughter in which Ambrose Bierce is a character.

The story has also influenced music. For example, the fourteenth track on Bressa Creeting Cake's self-titled 1997 album is entitled "Peyton Farquhar". The heavy metal band Deceased retold the tale in the song "The Hanging Soldier" on its 2000 album Supernatural Addiction. Adam Young has said that the story was the inspiration for the name of his 2007 electronica musical project, Owl City. The Doobie Brothers song "I Cheat The Hangman" was inspired by the story according its composer, Patrick Simmons. The song Mendokusai on Tellison's 2015 album Hope Fading Nightly features the refrain "We are all broken necked, swinging from the timbers of Owl Creek Bridge."

Adaptations
Several adaptations of "An Occurrence at Owl Creek Bridge" have been produced.

Movies, television, and videos
The Spy (also released as The Bridge) is a silent movie adaptation of the story, directed in 1929 by Charles Vidor.
 A TV version of the story starring British actor Ronald Howard was broadcast in 1959 during the fifth season of the Alfred Hitchcock Presents television anthology series.
La rivière du hibou ("The Owl River", known in English as An Occurrence at Owl Creek Bridge), a French version directed by Robert Enrico and produced by Marcel Ichac and Paul de Roubaix, was released in 1963.  Enrico's film won Best Short Subject at the 1962 Cannes Film Festival, and the 1963 Academy Award for Live Action Short Film. In 1964 La rivière du hibou aired on American television as an episode of the anthology series The Twilight Zone.
In 2006, the DVD Ambrose Bierce: Civil War Stories was released, which contains adaptations of three of Ambrose Bierce's short stories, among them "An Occurrence at Owl Creek Bridge" directed by Brian James Egan. The DVD also contains an extended version of the story with more background and detail than the one included in the trilogy.
Owl Creek Bridge, a 2008 short film by director John Giwa-Amu, won the BAFTA Cymru Award for best short. The story was adapted to follow the last days of Khalid, a young boy who is caught by a gang of racist youths.
"An Incident at Owl Creek" was a 2010 episode of the TV series American Dad!
The 2010 Babybird music video "Unloveable", directed by Johnny Depp, retells the Owl Creek Bridge story.
The 2011 Grouplove music video "Colours" also retells the Owl Creek Bridge story.
A 2013 short film, The Exit Room, starring Christopher Abbott as a journalist in a war-torn 2021 United States, is based on the story.
In the Jon Bon Jovi music video for the 1990 song "Dyin' Ain't Much Of A Livin'," the Owl Creek Bridge story is used as the theme.

Radio
In 1936, the radio series The Columbia Workshop broadcast an adaptation of "An Occurrence at Owl Creek Bridge".
William N. Robson's first script adaptation was broadcast on Escape December 10, 1947, starring Harry Bartell as Peyton Farquhar.
Suspense broadcast three different versions, all with slightly different scripts by William N. Robson:
December 9, 1956, starring Victor Jory as Farquhar;
December 15, 1957, starring Joseph Cotten as Farquhar;
July 9, 1959, starring Vincent Price as Farquhar.
CBS Radio Mystery Theater broadcast an adaptation by Sam Dann on June 4, 1974 (repeated on August 24, 1974, and September 15, 1979) starring William Prince.
Winifred Phillips narrated and composed original music for an abridged version of the story for the Tales by American Masters radio series, produced by Winnie Waldron on May 29, 2001.
The Twilight Zone Radio Dramas (2002) broadcast an adaptation of the story by M. J. Eliot directed by JoBe Cerny, starring Christian Stolte as Farquhar and featuring Stacy Keach as the narrator.

Other 
Issue #23 of the comics magazine Eerie, published in September 1969 by Warren Publishing, contained an adaptation of the story.
Scottish composer Thea Musgrave composed a one-act opera, An Occurrence at Owl Street Bridge, which was broadcast by the BBC in 1981. It was performed by baritone Jake Gardner and the London Sinfonietta conducted by the composer, with spoken roles taken by Ed Bishop, Gayle Hunnicutt and David Healy. This broadcast was released by NMC Records on CD (NMCD 167) in 2011. 
An Occurrence Remembered, a theatrical retelling of Bierce's An Occurrence At Owl Creek Bridge and Chickamauga, premiered in the fall of 2001 in New York City under the direction of Lorin Morgan-Richards and lead choreographer Nicole Cavaliere.

References

Further reading
Barrett, Gerald R. (1973). From Fiction to Film: An Occurrence at Owl Creek Bridge. Encino, CA: Dickenson Publishing. .
Blume, Donald T. (2004). Ambrose Bierce's Civilians and Soldiers in Context: A Critical Study. Kent, OH: Kent State University Press. .
Evans, Robert C. (2003). Ambrose Bierce's Occurrence at Owl Creek Bridge: An Annotated Critical Edition. West Cornwall, CT: Locust Hill Press. .
Owens, David M. (1994). "Bierce and Biography: The Location of Owl Creek Bridge". American Literary Realism, 1870–1910 26(3), pp. 82–89. (Online edition hosted by the Ambrose Bierce Project)
Stoicheff, Peter. (1993). "'Something Uncanny': The Dream Structure in Ambrose Bierce's 'An Occurrence at Owl Creek Bridge'". Studies In Short Fiction, 30(3), 349–358.
Talley, Sharon. (2010). Ambrose Bierce and the Dance of Death. Knoxville, TN: University of Tennessee Press. .
Yost, David. (2007). "Skins Before Reputations: Subversions of Masculinity in Ambrose Bierce and Stephen Crane". War, Literature & the Arts: An International Journal of the Humanities, 19(1/2), 247–260.

External links

 "An Occurrence at Owl Creek Bridge", collected in In the Midst of Life at the Internet Archive (scanned books original editions)
 
 Ambrose Bierce's "An Occurrence at Owl Creek Bridge". An Annotated Critical Edition
 Photographs of Sulfur Creek Trestle, the actual location which inspired Owl Creek Bridge.
 

1890 short stories
Existentialist short stories
Fiction with unreliable narrators
Short stories adapted into films
Short stories by Ambrose Bierce
Short stories set in the American Civil War
Stream of consciousness fiction
Works originally published in the San Francisco Examiner